Anil Jain (born 1972) is a Member of the Legislative Assembly of India. He represents the Niwari constituency of Madhya Pradesh and is a member of the Bharatiya Janata Party (BJP) political party.

References

External links
Myneta.info
Chief Electoral Officer Madhya Pradesh
Chief Electoral Officer Madhya Pradesh

Bharatiya Janata Party politicians from Madhya Pradesh
1972 births
Living people
People from Tikamgarh district
Date of birth missing (living people)
Madhya Pradesh MLAs 2013–2018
People from Niwari district